Jean-Jacques Bachelier (1724–1806) was a French painter and director of the porcelain factory at Sèvres.

Admitted to the Académie Royale de Peinture et de Sculpture in 1752, he founded an art school using his own means in Paris in 1765 for the artisans in the historic collège d'Autun (rue de l'école de médecine), which survived until the 19th century.

He was in effect the inventor of unglazed biscuit porcelain, which he was the first to use as a final product, in 1751 at Sèvres.  Previously this material was no more than a first stage in the porcelain manufacturing process.

Works 
For a list of works see: Jean-Jacques Bachelier (French edition), including Roman Charity (1765).

Written works 
Histoire et secret de la peinture à la cire, contre le sentiment du comte de Caylus. Paris 1755

Sources 

 Dictionnaire Bouillet

External links
 

1724 births
1806 deaths
18th-century French painters
French male painters
19th-century French painters
19th-century French male artists
18th-century French male artists